This is a list of all human spaceflights throughout history.  Beginning in 1961 with the flight of Yuri Gagarin aboard Vostok 1, human spaceflight occurs when a human crew flies a spacecraft into outer space.  Human spaceflight is distinguished from spaceflight generally, which entails both crewed and uncrewed spacecraft.

There are two definitions of spaceflight. This boundary is known as the Kármán line.

As of the launch of SpaceX Crew-6 on 02 March 2023, there have been 368 human spaceflight launches. Two missions did not cross either the Kármán line or the U.S. definition of space and therefore do not qualify as spaceflights.  These were the fatal STS-51-L (Challenger disaster), and the non-fatal aborted Soyuz mission T-10a.  Two aborted missions did cross either the Kármán line or the U.S. definition of space.  These were the non-fatal aborted Soyuz mission MS-10 which did not reach the Kármán line but did pass the 80 km (50 mi) line.  The other was the non-fatal Soyuz mission, 18a which crossed the Kármán line.  Four missions successfully achieved human spaceflight, yet ended as fatal failures as their crews died during the return.  These were Soyuz 1, X-15 flight 191, Soyuz 11, and STS-107 (Columbia disaster). Sixteen flights in total reached an apogee beyond , but failed to go beyond , so therefore do not qualify as spaceflights under the FAI definition.

Summary

Since 1961, three countries (China, Russia, and the United States) and one former country (Soviet Union) have conducted human spaceflight using thirteen different spacecraft series, or: "programs", "projects".

Human spaceflights
The Salyut series, Skylab, Mir, ISS, and Tiangong series space stations, with which many of these flights docked in orbit, are not listed separately here. See the detailed lists (links below) for information.

 Missions which were intended to reach space but which failed to do so are listed in italics.
 Missions between 80 km (50 mi) and 100 km (62 mi) are marked with an asterisk
 Fatal missions are marked with a dagger (†) symbol.

Timeline

See also
 List of human spaceflight programs
 List of human spaceflights, 1961–1970
 List of human spaceflights, 1971–1980
 List of human spaceflights, 1981–1990
 List of human spaceflights, 1991–2000
 List of human spaceflights, 2001–2010
 List of human spaceflights, 2011–2020
 List of human spaceflights, 2021–present
 Human presence in space

Notes

External links

 Spacefacts Compare with the present article.  The Spacefacts list includes most flights listed here, but omits twelve: The three failed launches of STS-51-L, Soyuz T-10a and Soyuz MS-10, none of which achieved human spaceflight, the uncrewed launch of Soyuz 34 (which nevertheless returned a crew to Earth), and the eight sub-orbital human spaceflights: Mercury-Redstone 3 and 4, X-15 flights 90 and 91, SpaceShipOne flights 15P, 16P and 17P, and Soyuz 18a.

 Astronautix Similarly, see the list for "Manned Spaceflight" given at Astronautix, which includes other related categories.

References
Vostok and Voskhod flight history 
Mercury flight history
X-15 flight history (altitudes given in feet)
Gemini flight history
Apollo flight history (student resource)
Skylab flight history
Apollo-Soyuz flight history
Space Shuttle flight history infographic
Shenzhou flight history timeline
SpaceShipOne flight history

Human spaceflight
 
Spaceflight timelines